Matunga Road is a neighbourhood in Mumbai. The Matunga Road railway station is located in Matunga Road area, on the Mumbai suburban railway on the Western Railway (India) railway line.

History
At 1.40pm on 29 October 1993 a "crude bomb with lots of nails" exploded under the seat of a second-class compartment in a train at Matunga Road station. 2 people died and 40 were injured.

Matunga Road was one of the stations affected by 11 July 2006 Mumbai train bombings. Just before 18.15, a bomb exploded in the first-class general compartment of the 17.57 Churchgate-Virar fast train as it approached Matunga Road station.

Kashi Vishveshwar Temple 

Matunga is a known haven for ancient temples. However, a lesser-known fact is that Matunga is also home to an ancient Shiva temple – Kashi Vishveshwar, which is over two centuries old. Peacefully nestled in the busy lane of the City Light Market at Matunga, the Kashi Vishveshwar temple – better known as Kashi of Mumbai – stands out in sharp contrast against the busy market surroundings. Originally built in 1783 by Dadoba Jagannath Mantri for his community – Somavanshi Pathare Kshatriya, which is one of the oldest communities of Mumbai.

The exclusivity of this temple lies in the unique image of Shiva Panchayat where Shiva is shown bearded. A brass-covered Shiva-ling is positioned in the main premise of the temple. Besides Lord Shiva, various other God and Goddess are lined up on the pooja altar that faces the porch meant for devotees. Although the number of devotees is not very high here but festivals such as Mahashivratri and Shravan month draw devotees in thundered. Currently, the Dadoba Jagannath Religious Trust (DJRT) does the upkeep of the temple. "Our trust carries out the maintenance of the temple and it conducts several festivals besides the regular temple ceremonies," shares Jayawant Desai, chairman of DJRT.

Temples 
Kashi Vishveshwar Templ
Sri Siddheshwar Hanuman Temple
Manmala Devi Temple
Shitla Devi Temple

Places to visit 
Shivaji Park
Kashi Vishveshwar Temple
Dadar Chaupati
Yashwantrao Chavan Natya Griha
Star City Cinema

Notes and references

Neighbourhoods in Mumbai

mr:माटुंगा रोड